Catacombe is a 2018 Dutch drama film directed by Victor D. Ponten. In July 2018, it was one of nine films shortlisted to be the Dutch entry for the Best Foreign Language Film at the 91st Academy Awards, but it was not selected.

Cast
 Willem de Bruin as Jermaine Slagter
 Kevin Janssens as Kevin van Looy
 Orion Lee as Charlie Yuen
 Werner Kolf as Samuel
 Liliana de Vries as Naomi
 Loes Schnepper as Coby

References

External links
 

2018 films
2018 drama films
Dutch drama films
2010s Dutch-language films